The 34th Filipino Academy of Movie Arts and Sciences Awards Night was held in 1987  in the Philippines .  This is for the Outstanding Achievements of the different  films for the year 1986.

Magdusa ka  won the most awards with four wins but it was Gabi na Kumader that won FAMAS Award for Best Picture both were produced by Viva Films.  On the other hand,  Nora Aunor earned her 15th consecutive nomination from FAMAS

Awards

Major Awards
Winners are listed first and highlighted with boldface.

{| class=wikitable
|-
! style="background:#EEDD82; width:50%" | Best Picture
! style="background:#EEDD82; width:50%" | Best Director
|-
| valign="top" |
 Gabi Na, Kumander — Viva Films Lumuhod ka sa Lupa — Sieko Films 
 Magdusa Ka! — Viva Films 
 Muslim Magnum .357 — FPJ Productions 
 Nasaan ka ng Kailangan Kita — Regal Films
 Unfaithful Life — Regal Films
| valign="top" |
 Eddie Garcia — Magdusa Ka
 Pepe Marcos — Gabi Na, Kumander 
 Manuel Fyke Cinco — Lumuhod Ka sa Lupa 
 Fernando Poe Jr. —  Muslim Magnum .357 
 Mel Chionglo — Nasaan Ka ng Kailangan Kita 
 Peque Gallaga — Unfaithful Wife
|-
! style="background:#EEDD82; width:50%" | Best Actor
! style="background:#EEDD82; width:50%" | Best Actress
|-
| valign="top" |
 Fernando Poe Jr. — Muslim Magnum .357
 Ramon Revilla — Cordillera
 Phillip Salvador — Gabi Na, Kumander 
 Rudy Fernandez — Lumuhod ka sa Lupa! 
 Edu Manzano — Palimos ng Pag-ibig 
 Richard Gomez — Tuklaw 
 Joel Torre — Unfaithful Wife 
| valign="top" |
 Dina Bonnevie — Magdusa Ka
 Nora Aunor — I Love you Mama, I Love you Papa Vilma Santos — Palimos ng Pag-ibig 
 Susan Roces — Nasaan ka ng Kailangan Kita 
 Jackie Lou Blanco — Lumuhod ka sa Lupa 
 Jacklyn Jose — Private Show 
 Sharon Cuneta — Sana'y Wala ng Wakas 
|-
! style="background:#EEDD82; width:50%" | Best Supporting Actor
! style="background:#EEDD82; width:50%" | Best Supporting Actress
|-
| valign="top" |
 Michael De Mesa — Unfaithful Wife
 Mark Gil — Agaw Armas Mario Montenegro — Anak ng Supremo 
 Ronaldo Valdez — Huwag mo Kaming Isumpa 
 Dindo Fernando — Magdusa Ka 
 Paquito Diaz — Magnum Muslim .357 
 George Estregan — Magkayakap sa Magdamag| valign="top" |
 Nida Blanca — Magdusa Ka!
 Chanda Romero — Agaw Armas 
 Lani Mercado — Blusang Itim Rio Locsin — Huwag mo Kaming Isumpa 
 Lorna Tolentino — Nakagapos na Puso 
 Dina Bonnevie — Palimos ng Pag-ibig 
 Donna VIlla — Paano Hahatiin ang Puso 
|-
! style="background:#EEDD82; width:50%" | Best Child Actor
! style="background:#EEDD82; width:50%" | Best Child Actress
|-
| valign="top" |
 Ian De Leon — I Love YOu Mama, I Love YOu Papa
 Monossi Mempin — Halimaw 
 Jaypee de Guzman — Huwag mo Kaming Isumpa
 Alvin Enriquez — Paano Hahatiin ang Puso 
| valign="top" |
 Precious Hipolito — Ang daigdig ay isang butil na luha 
 Rose Ann Gonzales — Lumuhod ka sa lupa! 
 Katrin Gonzales — Nasaan ka nang kailangan kita
 Glaiza Herradura — Paano hahatiin ang puso 
|-
! style="background:#EEDD82; width:50%" | Best in Screenplay
! style="background:#EEDD82; width:50%" | Best Story
|-
| valign="top" |
  Orlando Nadres  — Magdusa Ka! 
 Frank Rivera — Halimaw
 Frank Rivera — Bagong Hari'' 
| valign="top" |
  Bienvenido Bacalso — Gabi Na, Kumander|-
! style="background:#EEDD82; width:50%" | Best Sound 
! style="background:#EEDD82; width:50%" | Best Musical Score
|-
| valign="top" |
  Rolly Ruta — Lumohod ka sa Lupa 
| valign="top" |
  George Canseco — Palimos ng Pag-ibig 
|-
! style="background:#EEDD82; width:50%" | Best Cinematography 
! style="background:#EEDD82; width:50%" | Best Editing
|-
| valign="top" |
   Ver Reyes  — Muslim Magnum .357  
| valign="top" |
  Augusto Salvador —  Lumuhod ka Sa Lupa 
|-
! style="background:#EEDD82; width:50%" |  Best Theme Song
! style="background:#EEDD82; width:50%" | Production Design
|-
| valign="top" |
  Willy Cruz — Sana'y Wala ng Wakas| valign="top" |
  Rolando Sacristia — Muslim Magnum .357 
|-
|}

Special AwardeeLou Salvador, Sr. Memorial AwardPilita CorralesDr. Jose Perez Memorial AwardAlfie LorenzoDr. Ciriaco Santiago Memorial AwardEddie Romero Gregorio Valdez Memorial Award Manuel Morato - Censor's Chairman'''

References

External links
FAMAS Awards 

FAMAS Award
FAMAS
FAMAS